Chloropentafluoroethane is a chlorofluorocarbon (CFC) once used as a refrigerant and also known as R-115 and CFC-115.  Its production and consumption has been banned since 1 January 1996 under the Montreal Protocol because of its high ozone depletion potential and very long lifetime when released into the environment. CFC-115 is also a potent greenhouse gas.

Atmospheric properties
The atmospheric abundance of CFC-115 rose from 8.4 parts per trillion (ppt) in year 2010 to 8.7 ppt in 2020 based on analysis of air samples gathered from sites around the world.

See also 
 IPCC list of greenhouse gases
 List of refrigerants

References 

Ozone depletion
Greenhouse gases
Refrigerants
Chlorofluorocarbons